Curb Appeal is a half-hour TV series that has aired on HGTV in the United States from September 30, 1999 to the present, exploring how a house's outside "curb appeal" will be updated.  Various hosts over the years (including Sasha Andreev), talk the viewer through the planned improvements. Originally the new look was imagined by drawing the proposed changes over a still picture of the exterior but now computer-generated visualizations are created.  Changes include painting, landscaping, and fences, as well as pruning or removing overgrown shrubs, and sometimes cutting down good trees.

John Gidding is now the only host and more recent episodes involve multiple homes in a San Francisco Bay Area block, and are titled Curb Appeal.  There has also been at least one hour-long Christmas special, A Very Merry Curb Appeal, with two homes adorned with Christmas decorations.

References

External links

1999 American television series debuts
2000s American reality television series
2010s American reality television series
HGTV original programming